Matilda of Frisia (died in 1044) was Queen of the Franks as the first wife of Henry I. Her date of birth is unknown.

She was the daughter of Liudolf, Margrave of Frisia, and Gertrude of Egisheim. 

Matilda and Henry were married in 1034 after the death of his fiancée Matilda of Franconia.

Around 1040, Matilda of Frisia gave birth to a daughter via Caesarian section,, but four years later in 1044 both she and her daughter died only weeks apart. Matilda was buried in St Denis Abbey, but her tomb is not preserved.

Henry married Anne of Kiev after her death.

Proposed ancestry

References

1020s births
1044 deaths
Brunonids
House of Capet
French queens consort
Medieval Frisians
Burials at the Basilica of Saint-Denis
11th-century French people
11th-century French women
Frisian women
Deaths_in_childbirth